Dead Peepol is a Ghanaian music duo from Kumasi. They became popular with the hit song 'Otan Hunu'. They released a remix of the song which featured Fameye, Kuami Eugene, Medikal, Deon Boakye, Malcolm Nuna, Rich Kent, Tulenkey and Bosom P-Yung.

Discography

Selected singles 

 Medo Wo More
 Don't Worry Be Happy
 Otan Hunu
 Otan Hunu Remix
 Against
 No Noise

Videography 

 Otan Hunu
 Otan Hunu Remix
 Against
 No Noise

Awards and nominations

References 

Ghanaian musicians